Silkin is a surname. Notable people with the surname include:
 John Silkin (1923–1987), British politician
 Jon Silkin (1930–1997), British poet
 Lewis Silkin, 1st Baron Silkin (1889–1972), British politician
 Samuel Silkin, Baron Silkin of Dulwich (1918–1988), British politician
 Sergei Silkin (born 1961), Russian football player and coach